The Gas Act 1948 (11 & 12 Geo. 6. c. 67) was an Act of the Parliament of the United Kingdom which nationalised, or bought into state control, the gas making and supply industry in Great Britain. It established 12 Area Gas Boards to own and operate all public gas making, distribution and sales facilities and created a central authority: the Gas Council. It vested the existing local authority and company owned gas undertakings into the Area Boards with effect from 1 May 1949. The Gas Act 1948 was one of a number of Acts promulgated by the post-war Labour government to nationalise elements of the UK's industrial infrastructure; other Acts include the Coal Industry Nationalisation Act 1946; the Electricity Act 1947; Transport Act 1947 (railways and long-distance road haulage); and the Iron and Steel Act 1949.

Background 
Prior to nationalisation of the gas industry there were about 1,064 gas supply undertakings in Britain; about one-third were municipal local authority undertakings and about two-thirds were company undertakings.

In June 1944 the Minister of Fuel and Power appointed a committee of inquiry under the chairmanship of Geoffrey Heyworth to review the structure and organisation of the industry and to advise on changes to develop and cheapen gas supplies. The Committee reported in November 1945: The Gas Industry: Report of the Committee of Inquiry Cmd.6699. It recommended the compulsory purchase by the Government of all gas undertakings and the creation of ten regional gas boards. The Heyworth Committee report formed the basis of the Gas Bill 1948.

The Gas Act 1948 
The Gas Bill was introduced into the House of Commons on 22 January 1948 by Hugh Gaitskell the Minister of Fuel and Power. The Committee stage of the Bill was prolonged including a session of 51 hours. The Gas Act 1948 received Royal Assent in July 1948. Its long title is: ‘An Act to provide for the establishment of Area Gas Boards and a Gas Council and for the exercise and performance by those Boards and that Council of functions relating to the supply of gas and coke and certain other matters; for the transfer to such Boards as aforesaid and to the said Council of property, rights, obligations and liabilities of gas undertakers and other persons; for co-ordinating the activities of Area Gas Boards and the National Coal Board relating to carbonization; to amend the law relating to the supply of gas; to make certain consequential provision as to Income Tax; and for purposes connected with the matters aforesaid’.

Provisions 
Part 1 of Gas Act 1948 defined the way in which the industry was to be run. It specifically placed authority in the Area Boards, which were autonomous. Area Boards were charged with the three duties:

 To develop and maintain an efficient, co-ordinated and economical system of gas supply for their areas and to satisfy, so far as it is economic to do so, all reasonable demands for gas within their area.
 To develop and maintain the efficient, co-ordinated and economical production of coke, other than metallurgical coke.
 To develop and maintain efficient methods of recovering by-products obtained in the process of manufacturing gas.

Part 2 of the Act defined the assets to be acquired and how they were to be paid for. The Heyworth committee had recommended ten Area Boards, however the Act included Scotland and Wales making 12 Boards.

Section 9 established Consultative Councils for each Area Board. They were charged with considering any matter affecting the supply of gas in the area; and of considering and reporting to the Area Board any such matter. Each council had between 20 and 30 members. Some members were appointed as representatives of local authorities and some as representatives of commerce, industry, labour and other interests.

Section 22 defined the Gas Council's formal responsibilities:

 to advise the Minister in questions affecting the gas industry and matters relating thereto;
 to promote and assist the efficient exercise and performance by Area Boards of their function.

Section 51 required the gas industry to consult with the Coal Board to coordinate the operation of coke ovens which were owned and operated by collieries but which supplied the gas industry with gas.

Section 55 empowered the Minister to define the standards of the gas supplied including its pressure, calorific value and composition.

Section 62 empowered the Gas Council to take over the industry's existing bodies such as the British Gas Council and the Association of Gas Corporations.

Schedule 4 repealed all previous irrelevant enactments relating to the gas industry, the 1948 Act itself became the new legal basis.

Later enactments 
The Gas Act 1960 (8 & 9 Eliz. 2 c. 27) increased the Gas Council's borrowing powers to £500 million.

The Gas Act 1965 (1965 c. 36) increased the council's borrowing powers to £1,200 million; it also allowed it to manufacture or acquire gas and supply gas in bulk to Area Boards. The new powers allowed it to enter joint ventures with other corporations. For example, with Amoco to explore and exploit natural gas fields in parts of the Southern North Sea.

The Gas Act 1972 (1972 c. 60) repealed the Gas Act 1948 and the Gas Act 1960. The 1972 Act established the British Gas Corporation to centralise control and operation of the industry. With effect from 1 January 1973 the Area Boards were made regions of the British Gas Corporation and the Gas Council was abolished.

References

Natural gas industry in the United Kingdom
United Kingdom Acts of Parliament 1948